Alumni of Uppingham School are known as Old Uppinghamians.

Uppingham School is a co-educational independent school situated in the small market town of Uppingham in Rutland, England. The school was founded in 1584 by Robert Johnson, the Archdeacon of Leicester who also established Oakham School.

Notable former pupils include:

A
 Patrick Abercrombie, architect and town planner
Robert Adley, Member of Parliament for Bristol North East and Christchurch
 Crispin Agnew, Rothesay Herald and former explorer and mountaineer.
 Jonathan Agnew, England, Leicestershire cricketer and chief cricket correspondent for BBC Radio (The Lodge)
 John Aldam Aizlewood, Major-General, British Army officer in World War I and World War II
 John Aldridge, Royal Academician
 Anthony Armstrong, author, essayist, dramatist
 William Mitchell Acworth, British railway economist, barrister and politician

B
 Tristan Ballance, cricketer
 Adrian Bell, author of Corduroy
 Robin Blaze, countertenor
 Brian Boobbyer, England rugby player and evangelist for Moral Re-Armament
 Thomas George Bonney, geologist
 Ernle Bradford, historian and writer
 Katie Breathwick, broadcaster, Classic FM
 Edward Brittain, younger brother of Vera Brittain, whose stories are told in her autobiography Testament of Youth (The Lodge)

C
 Everard Calthrop, railway engineer and inventor
 Donald Campbell, World Land and Water Speed record holder, killed on Coniston Water in Bluebird (West Deyne)
 Sir Malcolm Campbell, holder of World Land and Water Speed records in 1920s and 1930s (West Deyne)
 Archie Cochrane, medic, researcher and pioneer of evidence-based medicine
 Holden Chow, solicitor and politician, vice-chairman of the Democratic Alliance of the Betterment and Progress of Hong Kong (DAB).

D
 Johnny Dawes, rock climber
 Adrian Dixon, Master of Peterhouse, Cambridge University
 Eric Dorman-Smith, British Army officer and Irish nationalist
 Stephen Dorrell, Health Secretary 1995–97
 Norman Douglas, novelist and travel writer
 Charles Dunstone, co-founder of Carphone Warehouse (Lorne House)

E
 John H. Edwards, geneticist, and his brother A. W. F. Edwards, statistician
 Dan Everard, British inventor, engineer and author

F
 William Fawcett, writer on horses, hunting and racing
 Ronald Firbank, novelist
 Pat Fish, songwriter and musician
 James Elroy Flecker, poet and dramatist
 Thomas Fowler, cricketer
 Nick Freeman, "Mr Loophole", celebrity lawyer
 Edward Fowler, cricketer
 Stephen Fry, actor, comedian (Blackadder) and writer (Fircroft), expelled in 1972

G
Christopher Gabbitas, baritone for The King's Singers
William Garforth, cricketer and soldier
Andrew Gimson, political journalist (West Bank)
Piers Gough, architect (West Bank)

H
 John Hare, cricketer
 Johnny Hon, entrepreneur and founder of The Global Group
 Mark Haddon, author of The Curious Incident of the Dog in the Night-Time
 Russell Harmer, Olympic gold medalist
 George Harris, cricketer
 Oliver Hill, architect (Hall)
 E. W. Hornung, author
 Danny Hipkiss, professional rugby player, Leicester Tigers and England
 Brian Horrocks, British Army general, distinguished corps commander in the Second World War
 Henry Hughes, cricketer
 Balfour Oliphant Hutchison, Lieutenant-General, KBE, CB, British Army officer in World War I and World War II

I
 George Ivatt, mechanical engineer

J
 Hugh Jackman, actor (former teaching assistant)
 Christian Jessen, doctor and television presenter (Fircroft)
 Harry Judd, musician and member of McFly (Fircroft)

K
 Boris Karloff, actor Frankenstein (1931 film)
 Dominic Keating, actor (West Deyne)
 Andrew Kennedy, Tenor (Winner of Rosenblatt Song Prize at Cardiff Singer of the World 2005) (Fircroft)
 Patrick Kinmonth, opera director, stage designer, writer
 Norman Knight, cricketer and colonial administrator

L
 Edward Thurlow Leeds, archaeologist, keeper of the Ashmolean Museum 19281945
 John Lees, cricketer
 David Li, current chairman and chief executive of the Bank of East Asia in Hong Kong
 Roland Leighton, fiancé of Vera Brittain, whose stories are told in her autobiography Testament of Youth (The Lodge)

M
  
 Claude Maxwell Macdonald, soldier-diplomat
 Gregor MacGregor, England, Scotland, Cambridge University, Middlesex cricketer and rugby player
 Charles Mallam, cricketer
 Lionel Martineau, cricketer
 John McIver, Scottish cricketer
 Tim McMullan, actor (School House)
 Roger Miller, cricketer
 Sir Dermot Milman, 8th Baronet, rugby union international and first-class cricketer
 Ed Minton and Alex Davies, members of rock band Elliot Minor (School House)
 Ernest John Moeran, composer
 Cecil Moon, cricketer
 Oscar Murton, Baron Murton of Lindisfarne, politician
 john Manzoni. First chief executive officer of the civil service.

N
 Richard Lewis Nettleship, philosopher
 C. R. W. Nevinson, war artist in both world wars
 Ernest Newton, architect, president RIBA
 Anthony Nightingale, Taipan, Jardine Matheson & Co., Hongkong.

P
William Pershke, cricketer
Dickson Poon, businessman and non-executive Chairman of Harvey Nichols
Peter Powell, Radio One disc jockey
William Henry Pratt, who achieved fame under his stage name, Boris Karloff
James Purves, cricketer

R
Charles E. Raven, Vice-Chancellor of Cambridge University, theologian, intellectual, preacher
 Hardwicke Rawnsley, co-founder of the National Trust
 Mark Redhead, Producer
 Victor Richardson, associate of Vera Brittain, whose stories are told in her autobiography Testament of Youth (The Lodge)
 Edward Riddell, cricketer
 Thomas Ridley, cricketer, barrister and clergyman
 Sam Riley, actor
 David Ross, co-founder of Carphone Warehouse (Constables)
 Alan Rotherham, (left in 1881), former England rugby union international, captain of England, and inductee into the IRB Hall of Fame
 Guy Rowlands, historian (The Lodge)

S
 Reginald Savory, British Indian Army Officer in World War I and World War II
 John Schlesinger, film director
 Cecil Sharp, musician, collector and populariser of English folk song and dance
 Charlie Simpson, musician in Busted (2002–2005, 2015–present), Fightstar (2003–present) and as a solo artist (2011–present) (Meadhurst)
 Arthur Somervell, composer
 Toby Spence, tenor
 Phil Spencer, property expert, Channel 4 television (The Lodge)
 Ed Stafford, explorer, walking the length of the Amazon River
 Rick Stein, chef and restaurateur (West Deyne)
 George Martin Stephen, former High Master of St Paul's School
 John Suchet, journalist and broadcaster  (Farleigh)

T
 Shiv Thakor, cricketer
 Richard Thorp, actor ('Emergency Ward 10'; 7 years, 'Emmerdale'; 30 years), writer
 Robert Thorogood, actor (Cambridge Footlights), writer Death in Paradise (Fircroft)
 Richard Tice, businessman, politician. 
 Edward Timpson Conservative Member of Parliament for Crewe and Nantwich
 Edward Titley, cricketer

V
 Johnny Vaughan, TV presenter (Lorne House)

W
 Anthony Way, former chorister, St Paul's Cathedral (School House)
 James Whitaker, Leicestershire and England cricketer (The Lodge)
 Jenny Willott, Member of Parliament for Cardiff Central
 Charles Plumpton Wilson (1859–1938), England footballer

Y
 William Yates, former member of both British and Australian Parliaments

See also
 :Category:People educated at Uppingham School

References